Making Monsters is the fifth studio album by the American aggrotech band Combichrist. The album was released on CD, CD/DVD, double album and digital download.

CD track listing
All songs written by Andy LaPlegua.

DVD track listing (Digipak edition)

Charts

References

Combichrist albums